Elín Helena Petersdóttir (born 1 June 1972) is an Icelandic-Finnish theater and film actress. She is known for Eurovision Song Contest: The Story of Fire Saga, Stars Above (Finnish: Tähtitaivas talon yllä) and Apeiron.

Early life 
Elín was born in Iceland to actors Borgar Garðarson and Gréta Þórsdóttir. When she was 1-year old, her family moved to Finland. After her parents divorced, her mother married actor Peter Snickars, a Swedish speaking Finn. Elín studied acting in Denmark and later at Stella Adler Studio of Acting in New York City.

Filmography
Unna ja Nuuk (2006) – Kaunisohto
Stars Above (2012) – Salla
Apeiron (2013) – Anna
Hemma (2013) – Eva
Devil's Bride (2016) – Rakel Larsdotter
Eurovision Song Contest: The Story of Fire Saga (2020) – Helka

References

External links
 

1972 births
Living people
Finnish film actresses
Elín Petersdóttir
Elín Petersdóttir